HMS Pelorus was the first of the s, and was laid down at Sheerness dockyard in 1895. Completed and commissioned into the Royal Navy in 1897, she was designed by Sir William White. Construction cost £154,315. The ship was well armed for her size, but was primarily a workhorse for the overseas fleet.

She had reciprocating triple expansion engines and Normand water-tube boilers which could give  for limited periods of time with forced draught, and  under natural draught. It carried a crew complement of 224 men and it was armed with eight QF 4 inch (102 mm) (25 pounder) guns, eight QF 3 pounder (47-mm) guns, three machine guns, and two 18-inch (450-mm) torpedo tubes.

Service history
Pelorus served in the Channel Fleet under Captain Henry Charles Bertram Hulbert, when in February 1900 she joined the Eastern division of the fleet.

In 1901, the ship was stationed at Gibraltar under the command of Commander Ernest Troubridge. The following year she paid off at Devonport, had her boilers repaired, and in August was towed to Clydebank to be refitted by Messrs J. Brown and Co. in Glasgow.

In 1906, the ship was assigned to the Cape of Good Hope Station under the command of Commander James C. Tancred. In 1908 the captain was Arthur W Craig.

References

E E Highams, 'Across a Continent in a Man of War' (Westminster Press, London, 1909)

External links

 

Pelorus-class cruisers of the Royal Navy
Ships built in Sheerness
1896 ships
World War I cruisers of the United Kingdom